The Turks and Caicos Islands competed at the 2018 Commonwealth Games in the Gold Coast, Australia from April 4 to April 15, 2018.

Sport shooter Latoya Rigby was the island's flag bearer during the opening ceremony.

Competitors
The following is the list of number of competitors participating at the Games per sport/discipline.

Athletics

The Turks and Caicos Islands participated with 5 athletes (5 men).

Men
Track & road events

Field events

Shooting

The Turks and Caicos Islands participated with 2 athletes (1 man and 1 woman).

References

Nations at the 2018 Commonwealth Games
2018
2018 in the Turks and Caicos Islands